Filovci is a village southeast of Bogojina in the Municipality of Moravske Toplice in the Prekmurje region of Slovenia.

A number of traditional houses in the village have been declared cultural monuments, as well preserved typical examples of local thatched architecture from the late 19th and early 20th centuries.

Notable people
Notable people that were born or lived in Filovci include:
Ferenc Oslay (1883–1932), historian and writer

References

External links 

Filovci on Geopedia

Populated places in the Municipality of Moravske Toplice